Spanish Bay can mean:

Spanish Bay (Nova Scotia) - A bay in Nova Scotia, which includes Sydney Harbour, extending into the Cabot Strait
The Links at Spanish Bay - a golf course at Pebble Beach
The Inn at Spanish Bay - a resort at Pebble Beach